Holyport (pronounced Hollyport) is a suburban village in the civil parish of Bray (where at the 2011 Census the population was included), about  south of Maidenhead town centre in the English county of Berkshire.

Etymology 
The name 'Holyport' originates from Old English horig + port meaning 'muddy market-town', although a local folk etymology holds that the village was a stopping-off point for pilgrims travelling from Canterbury to St David's. The first element had become 'Holy-' by the end of the 14th Century.

Amenities 
The village has a butcher, a newsagent, a grocery, a small café and a hairdresser as well as the post office and a doctor's surgery. Holyport has four public houses - The George, The Belgian Arms, The White Hart and The Jolly Gardener. Also in the village are Holyport Church of England Primary School, Holyport College and Holyport Cricket Club. An hourly bus service operated by Courtney Coaches connects the village to Windsor and Maidenhead. Holyport has a nature reserve on the edge of the village, Bray Pit. Local residents banded together and in 2018 the incumbent Prime Minister Theresa May unveiled a defibrillator located at the local community centre with a second defibrillator located outside the local doctor's surgery.

There is also a village hall, Holyport Memorial Hall, tennis court, children's playground and playing field all of which are owned and managed by the Holyport Community Trust, a Charitable Incorporated Organisation. The playground was rebuilt in 2022 following a year long fund raising exercise and officially opened on 21st Oct 2022 by Theresa May and Paralympian, Jeanette Chippington

Notable residents and visitors
Holyport has one of the world's few real tennis courts (Royal County of Berkshire Real Tennis Club), where Prince Edward first met his wife-to-be, Sophie Rhys-Jones. Holyport was the home of the prestigious stables of Horace Smith, later known as Smith's Stables, where Queen Elizabeth II rode with her sister Princess Margaret in their younger years.

Monty Python filmed a Maypole dance-related sketch on the green, the film Happy is the Bride was shot here and in Bray, and Joan Collins filmed an advertisement in Holyport. The movie One of Our Dinosaurs Is Missing was partly filmed in Holyport. A scene from the 1995 Mr. Bean episode, entitled 'Tee off Mr. Bean', was filmed on Holyport Green. Holyport was the final residence of veteran BBC TV presenter Frank Bough until his death in 2020, and for many years the former actor Tom Adams, who died in 2014, was spotted frequently in the village pubs. Stirling Moss, the racing driver, lived in the village, and was a member of the Bray and Holyport Scout Group.

Sport and leisure
The village's soccer team Holyport F.C. plays in the Hellenic Football League. Its cricket club plays in the Chilterns Cricket League on Saturdays and in friendlies against local clubs on Sundays. The Holyport Village Fair is held on the village green on one Saturday in June every year. This fair has been running since 1946 and draws large crowds from the surrounding area - 2020 is believed to be the first year since the fair's inception that it did not take place.

References

Villages in Berkshire
Bray, Berkshire